KPR Ostrovia, known as Arged KPR Ostrovia for sponsorship reasons, is a men's handball club from Ostrów Wielkopolski, Poland. It plays in the PGNiG Superliga.

History
Historical names:
KPR Ostrovia (1996–2021)
Arged KPR Ostrovia (2021–)

Team

Current squad
Squad for the 2022–23 season

Goalkeepers
1  Mikołaj Krekora
 31  Dawid Balcerek
 90  Jakub Zimny

Left wingers
6  Przemysław Urbaniak
 19  Bartłomiej Tomczak
 76  Kacper Krawczyk
Right wingers
9  Artur Klopsteg
 21  Mikołaj Bestian
 23  Mikołaj Szych
Line players
 13  Filip Wadowski
 15  Damian Pawelec
 18  Krzysztof Misiejuk
 22  Mateusz Wojciechowski

Left backs
5  Kamil Adamski
 17  Patryk Marciniak
 68  Ksawery Gajek
Centre backs
 10  Łukasz Gierak
 25  Łukasz Wołowicz
 31  Mikołaj Przybylski
Right backs
2  Jakub Przybylski
 29  Marek Szpera

Transfers
Transfers for the 2022–23 season

 Joining
  Mikołaj Krekora (GK) (from  Energa MKS Kalisz)
  Bartłomiej Tomczak (LW) (from  Energa MKS Kalisz)
  Przemysław Urbaniak (LW) (from  KS AZS-AWF Biała Podlaska)
  Łukasz Gierak (CB) (from  Sandra SPA Pogoń Szczecin)
  Marek Szpera (RB) (from  Energa MKS Kalisz)
  Krzysztof Misiejuk (P) (from  Stal Mielec)

 Leaving
  Patryk Foluszny (GK) (to  SV 64 Zweibrücken)
  Michał Bałwas (LW) (to  MKS Wieluń) ?
  Bartosz Smoliński (LW) (to  Stal Mielec)
  Damian Krzywda (RB) (to ?)

References

External links
 

Polish handball clubs
Sport in Ostrów Wielkopolski
Handball clubs established in 1996
1996 establishments in Poland